Tarte may refer to:

Food
, Alsatian wood-fired dish
, upside-down fruit tart
, dessert pastry
Tarte des Alpes a pastry found specifically in the Southern Alps
Tarte al d'jote culinary speciality of the city of Nivelles, Belgium

Other
Tarte Cosmetics, a brand of beauty products
Tarte (surname)
Tarte (album), 2007 debut album by Majandra Delfino

See also
Tart (disambiguation)